Mudgee Cranney (23 October 1886 – 29 January 1971) was an Australian cricketer. He played fifteen first-class matches for New South Wales between 1909/10 and 1921/22.

See also
 List of New South Wales representative cricketers

References

External links
 

1886 births
1971 deaths
Australian cricketers
New South Wales cricketers
People from Parramatta